Bolton Point may refer to:

Bolton Point, New South Wales
Bolton Point (water system)